Rabka-Zdrój (in Goral dialects: Robka, colloquially: Rabka) is a spa town in Lesser Poland Voivodeship, Poland. It is located between Kraków and Zakopane in a valley on the northern slopes of the Gorce Mountains, where the rivers Poniczanka and Słonka join the river Raba. It has about 13,000 inhabitants. There is a substantial population of Gorals in the town. 
 
Rabka was always known for its salt-works, and from 1864 became a popular spa town. The first treatment centre for children was established a few years later and continues to this day. Hydrotherapy continues to be utilised in local hospital and sanatoriums.

The Władysław Orkan Museum established in a former 17th-century larch-wood church, includes a collection of folk sculpture and paintings on glass. It also houses the "Order of the Smile Museum" (which children award to adults) and hosts events such as a winter carnival, the Carpathian Festival of Children's Regional Ensembles and the Mountain Children's Holiday International Festival. Other entertainment and folk events are held in the summer season.

Nazi Police School 
During World War II, the Germans established a Nazi police school called the Sipo-SD Academy in the town, to train executioners and torturers. The school and its surroundings were the place of numerous atrocities before it was eventually closed down as the war approached its end and the Germans left.

The Commandant of the school was originally SS Hauptsturmfuhrer Hans Krueger and the deputy and police secretary was SS Untersturmfuhrer Wilhelm Karl Johannes Rosenbaum. The Nazi Police training school was originally situated in Zakopane, but was moved to Rabka in July 1940 along with the permanent staff and the Jewish workers.

It has been estimated that over thirty Jewish roundups were conducted on the neighborhoods surrounding the school. The rounded up Jews were executed inside the school and in the woods behind the school with particularly pious Jews being treated the worst. To cover up the numerous murders at the school Rosenbaum ordered the Rabka Town Clerk, Cheslav Triboski, to register their deaths as “victims of heart attacks.”

Notable people
Łukasz Jarosz (born 1979), heavyweight boxer
Maria Kaczyńska, married to Lech Kaczyński (former President of Poland), was educated in Rabka.
Andrzej Bargiel (born 1988), ski mountaineer, backcountry skier, mountain runner and climber
Jan Ziobro (born 1991), ski jumper

Gallery

References

External links

 
Interactive Map
Jewish Community in Rabka-Zdrój on Virtual Shtetl
On-line version of the book Mroczne Sekrety willi "Tereska": 1939-1945 by Rapta, Tupta, and Moskal (2009 edition). 
On-line version of the book The Rabka Four by O'Neil

Cities and towns in Lesser Poland Voivodeship
Rabka Zdroj
Kingdom of Galicia and Lodomeria
Kraków Voivodeship (1919–1939)
Spa towns in Poland